, Op. 29, is a melodrama or "improvisation for narrator, mixed choir and orchestra" by Jean Sibelius. He completed it in 1900 on a text by Viktor Rydberg. It was first performed in Helsinki on 20 October 1900, with the Orchestra of the Helsinki Philharmonic Society, conducted by Robert Kajanus.

History 
The poem had previously been set in full by Wilhelm Stenhammar (Op. 5) in 1891. Sibelius composed the work in the fall of 1900 on a poem by Viktor Rydberg. He later noted: "I wrote Snöfrid more or less at one sitting after I came home from three days of lively celebrations." The plot on which it is based is inspired by old Scandinavian balladic stories. A female protagonist appeals to her compatriots, in particular a hero, to fight for freedom as a higher goal than fortune, fame and pleasure. Sibelius was inspired by several works by Rydberg, including solo songs and Skogsrået (The Wood Nymph). He liked Rydberg's free verse, expressing both erotic and political ideas. The heroic element possibly appealed to his own battles "with everybody and everything". Sibelius chose dramatic scenes from the poem, such as Snöfrid's "If you choose me, then you choose the tempest." The instrumental prelude depicts a storm at night, with whining strings, howling brass, thundering percussion, but "dominated by melodic and harmonic elements".

The work was first performed in Helsinki on 20 October 1900, with the Orchestra of the Helsinki Philharmonic Society, conducted by Robert Kajanus. The occasion was a lottery to finance a tour of the orchestra to Paris. An unsigned review in the newspaper Päivälehti noted: 

Later Sibelius composed the last movement on a different text, Volter Kilpi's Ylistys taiteelle. This version was first performed on 9 April 1902.

Recordings 
Snöfrid is the title of a 2001 recording of this work along with other music by Sibelius, including the Cantata for the Coronation of Nicholas II, Rakastava (The Lover), Oma maa (My country) and Andante Festivo. On volume 54 of a complete Sibelius Edition by BIS, Osmo Vänskä conducts the Jubilate Choir and the Lahti Symphony Orchestra, the narrator is Stina Ekblad. A review notes that the "galloping early pages" are reminiscent of the Second Symphony and continues:

References

Further reading 
 Tomi Mäkelä: "Jean Sibelius und seine Zeit" (in German), Laaber-Verlag, Regensburg 2013

External links 

Melodramas
Compositions by Jean Sibelius
1900 compositions
Compositions with a narrator